Epilepsy Ireland, known as Brainwave – The Irish Epilepsy Association prior to 7 February 2013, is a charity in Ireland who, among a wide variety of objectives, provide support, information and advice to people with epilepsy. They were founded in 1966, and are based in Dublin, with nine regional offices throughout Ireland.

References

External links
Official website

Charities based in the Republic of Ireland
Epilepsy organizations
Medical and health organisations based in the Republic of Ireland